In common law jurisdictions, the generic term officer of the court is applied to all those who, in some degree in the function of their professional or similar qualifications, have a part in the legal system. Officers of the court may include entities such as judges, lawyers, and paralegals, and should not be confused with court officers, the law enforcement personnel who work in courts.   

Officers of the court have legal and ethical obligations. They are tasked to participate to the best of their ability in the functioning of the judicial system to forge justice out of the application of the law and the simultaneous pursuit of the legitimate interests of all parties and the general good of society.

Court proper
Foremost those who make the decisions that determine the course of justice and its outcome:
judges, magistrates, and arbitrators.
prosecutors and crime victim advocates.
attorneys for each party – the Supreme Court of the United States held in Ex parte Garland that "Attorneys and counselors are not officers of the United States; they are officers of the court, admitted as such by its order upon evidence of their possessing sufficient legal learning and fair private character." In some jurisdictions, such as England and Wales, independent advocates such as barristers are not officers of the court, whereas in other jurisdictions, such as Ontario, Canada, advocates like paralegals are recognized as officers of the court (though with a more limited scope of practice than lawyers).

Investigation and expertise
These are people who may appear in court and testify or offer opinions due to their expertise or experience in a given subject. Their opinions sometimes rise to the level of scientific evidence and are evaluated by judges and juries to reach conclusions or verdicts. Another term for persons consulted by a court is amici curiae.
Coroners, medical examiners, mental health professionals, and other medical experts.
Other experts in various fields, such as state-certified appraisers, certified public accountants, handwriting analysis experts, and other professionally licensed or certified persons retained by the parties to give expert advice, the testimony and exhibits of which is admitted by the Court.
Marshals, sheriffs, constables, and other kinds of peace officers

Services to the parties
These are people whose professional duties are important to the functioning of the court system.
Bail bondsmen, who may, however, undertake action to capture an absconding client.
Interpreters/translators are generally considered officers of the court.  They render their services to the parties in the interests of the court proceedings.  Some interpreters may be employed on a permanent basis by courts to act as interpreters when called upon, e.g. International Court of Justice and the European Court of Justice. In some jurisdictions, interpreters may also be deemed as officers of the court pro tempore. Court interpreters and translators have an absolute ethical duty to tell judges the truth and avoid evasion.
Court-appointed special advocates in some jurisdictions are considered officers of the court.
Process servers carry out service of process. In some jurisdictions, they are appointed by a court and are considered appointed officers of the court.
Messenger of the Court, who will carrying communications, verbal or written, and execute other orders of the court.

See also
 Officer of the United States

Sources and references

Law.com
Publications bibliography

Legal ethics
Legal professions
Common law legal terminology
Judicial legal terminology